Titanium(II) sulfide (TiS) is an inorganic chemical compound of titanium and sulfur.

A meteorite, Yamato 691, contains tiny flecks of this compound, making it a new mineral called wassonite.

References

Sulfides
Titanium(II) compounds
Nickel arsenide structure type